The Licensed Victuallers' School (LVS Ascot) is a private, co-educational, day and boarding school for pupils aged 4 to 18, situated near Ascot in the English county of Berkshire. It is operated by the Licensed Trade Charity, and parents who work in the licensed drinks trade receive a 20% discount on fees.

History

Founded in 1803 by the Society of Licensed Victuallers (now operating as the Licensed Trade Charity), the school was originally situated in Kennington, London. As industrialization advanced, the school lost its "wholesome and airy environment", and so in 1922 left the city for a site in Slough. The same concern caused the school to move to its current home in Ascot in 1989.

Today

The Queen was the school's patron. The school's 900 pupils, of which some 200 are boarders, are split into four houses: Boarders, Bell's, Courage, and Whitbread. Facilities include an indoor swimming pool, a 300-seat theatre, a recording studio, a sports centre, a gym, and a rock-climbing wall. A new all-weather sports pitch was opened by Olympic hockey medallist Sarah Thomas in 2014.

References

External links
The Licensed Trade Charity's website
LVS Ascot's website

Private schools in Bracknell Forest
Educational institutions established in 1803
1803 establishments in England
Sunninghill and Ascot